In 2012, Ghulam Jelani Popal, commonly referred to as Jelani Popal, was appointed as the Governance Advisor to the President of Afghanistan. From September 2007 to December 2010, he was appointed as the first Director General of the Independent Directorate Local Governance (IDLG) in Afghanistan. Between 2003 and 2005 after the collapse of the Taliban and establishment of the new Afghan Government,  Mr. Popal served as Deputy Minister for Customs and Revenue under the Ministry of Finance Ministry of Finance (Afghanistan).

Early life 
Mr. Popal was born in the Barikot neighborhood of Kabul, Afghanistan, where his forefathers settled during the reign of Timur Shah Abdali when the Afghan Capital was moved from Kandahar to Kabul. He is a graduate of Habibia High School and the Faculty of Law at Kabul University.

Career
Between 1982 and 1989, he was the program officer for the Salvation Army Refugee Assistance Program in Pakistan. Mr. Popal founded and managed the Afghan Development Association between 1990 and 2000, and was also one of the 7 founding directors of Afghan Health And Development Services (AHDS). Between 1995 and 1999, he was a representative of the Afghan Civil Society to the United Nations. From 2000–2003, he worked as the Senior Social Worker for  San Joaquin County, California, United States. He has attended numerous management and development courses in Europe and the United States and is fluent in English, Pashtu, Dari, and Urdu.

Political affiliation 
Ghulam Jelani Popal was  the Vice President of Afghan Social Democratic Party (Afghan Mellat). Since last year the post of a vice president in the Afghan Mellat does not exist anymore.

References 

 Embassy of Afghanistan 
 Afghan Ministry of Finance  
 PRT Conference Speaker Biographies 
 Afghan Bios 
 Afghan Health and Development Services Afghan Health And Development Services
 Afghan Health and Development Services 

Afghan businesspeople
Living people
1955 births
Afghan Millat Party politicians
Government ministers of Afghanistan
Kabul University alumni
Pashtun people